Mount Kenya is the second highest mountain in Africa and the highest mountain in Kenya, after which the country is named. It lies just south of the equator and currently has eleven small glaciers. Various expeditions reached it in the following years. It was first climbed in 1899 by Halford Mackinder. The mountain became a national park in 1949, played a key role in the Mau Mau events in the 1950s, and became a UNESCO World Heritage Site in 1997. It is climbed and walked up by up to 15,000 tourists every year.

Mount Kenya

Mount Kenya received its current name by European missionaries who, wrote the name as 'Kenya' from the Akamba word 'kiinyaa'. The first missionaries, Johann Ludwig Krapf, and Johannes Rebmann, were led into Kenyas interior by Akamba long-distance traders. So when they asked the name of the mountain, they were given the name 'kiima kya kenia'. 'kenia' in Kamba means to glitter, or to shine, hence the Akamba people referred to it as the mountain that glitters, or the shining mountain. So these missionaries recorded it as Mt. Kenya, a Kamba word, and the country was then later named after this mountain. Wangari Maathai tells the following story about the naming: Krapf and Johannes Rebmann asked their guide, a member of the Kamba community, who was carrying a gourd, what they called the mountain, and the guide, believing that the Germans were referring to the gourd, replied kĩĩ-nyaa, which became the name of the mountain and then the country. 
Other ethnic groups living around the mountain such as the Agikuyu called this mountain 'Kirinyaga'; 'nyaga' in Kikuyu means white patches, hence it is also the Kikuyu word for Ostrich, and 'kiri' means with: so in essence they called it the mountain with ostriches. The Maasai call it Ol Donyo Eibor or Ol Donyo Egere, which mean "the White mountain" or "the speckled mountain" respectively.

Krapf was staying in a Wakamba village when he first saw the mountain.
Krapf, however, recorded the name as both Kenia and Kegnia. According to some sources, this is a corruption of the Wakamba Kiinyaa.
Others however say that this was on the contrary a very precise notation of a native word pronounced .
Nevertheless, the name was usually pronounced  in English.

It is important to note that at the time this referred to the mountain without having to include mountain in the name. The current name Mount Kenya was used by some as early as 1894, but this was not a regular occurrence until 1920 when Kenya Colony was established. Before 1920 the area now known as Kenya was known as the British East Africa Protectorate and so there was no need to mention mount when referring to the mountain. Mount Kenya was not the only English name for the mountain as shown in Dutton's 1929 book Kenya Mountain. By the 1930s Kenya was becoming the dominant spelling, but Kenia was occasionally used.
At this time both were still pronounced  in English.

Kenya achieved independence in 1963, and Jomo Kenyatta was elected as the first president.
He had previously assumed this name to reflect his commitment to freeing his country and his pronunciation of his name resulted in the pronunciation of Kenya in English changing back to an approximation of the original native pronunciation, the current . So the country was named after the colony, which in turn was named after the mountain as it is a very significant landmark. To distinguish easily between the country and the mountain, the mountain became known as Mount Kenya  with the current pronunciation . Mount Kenya is featured on the coat of arms of Kenya.

Peaks

The peaks of Mount Kenya have been given names from three different sources. Firstly, several Maasai chieftains have been commemorated, with names such as Batian, Nelion and Lenana. These names were suggested by Mackinder, on the suggestion of Sidney Langford Hinde, who was the resident officer in Maasailand at the time of Mackinder's expedition. They commemorate Mbatian, a Maasai Laibon (Medicine Man), Nelieng, his brother, and Lenana and Sendeyo, his sons. Terere is named after another Maasai headman.

The second type of names that were given to peaks are after climbers and explorers. Some examples of this are Shipton, Sommerfelt, Tilman, Dutton and Arthur. Shipton made the first ascent of Nelion, and Sommerfelt accompanied Shipton on the second ascent. Tilman made many first ascents of peaks with Shipton in 1930. Dutton and Arthur explored the mountain between 1910 and 1930. Arthur Firmin, who made many first ascents, has been remembered in Firmin's Col. Humphrey Slade, of Pt Slade, explored the moorland areas of the mountain in the 1930s, and possibly made the first ascent of Sendeyo.

The remaining names are after well-known Kenyan personalities, with the exception of John and Peter, which were named by the missionary Arthur after two disciples. Pigott was the Acting Administrator of Imperial British East Africa at the time of Gregory's expedition, and there is a group of four peaks to the east of the main peaks named after governors of Kenya and early settlers; Coryndon, Grigg, Delamere and McMillan.

The majority of the names were given by Melhuish and Dutton, with the exception of the Maasai names and Peter and John. Pt Thomson is not named after Joseph Thomson, who confirmed the mountain's existence, but after another J Thomson who was an official Royal Geographical Society photographer.

Valleys

Lakes

Glaciers

Rivers
Rivers starting above  are listed clockwise around the mountain from the north. Tributaries rivers which include the original name in their names are not listed, for example Liki North and Liki South. The rivers on Mount Kenya have been named after the villages on the slopes of the mountain that they flow close to. The Thuchi River is the district boundary between Meru and Embu. Mount Kenya is a major water tower for the Tana river which in 1988 supplied 80% of Kenya's electricity using a series of seven hydroelectric power stations and dams.

Other features

References

Mount Kenya
Mount Kenya Names
Mount Kenya Names